Delwyn may refer to:

Delwyn Brownlee (born 1969), New Zealand former cricketer
Delwyn Clark, New Zealand strategic management academic
Delwyn Costello (1960–2018), New Zealand cricketer
Delwyn Gage (born 1930), American politician in Montana
Delwyn Williams (born 1938), British Conservative Party politician and solicitor
Delwyn Young (born 1982), American professional baseball utility player

See also
Dodo Delwyn, fictional character in The Clown (1953 film)